Frank Coppola (born Francesco Paolo Coppola), known as Frank Three Fingers (1899 in Partinico – 26 April 1982 in Aprilia), was an Italian-American mobster and crime boss.

Background 
Frank Coppola was born in Partinico, Sicily, Italy in 1899. In 1926 he emigrated clandestinely to the United States and settled in Detroit. He worked as a laborer and then as a seller of fruit and vegetables, before entering the mob. He was known as Frank Three Fingers because he lacked two, the left ring finger and little finger after his fingers had slipped inside the door of a safe during a robbery and had to be cut off with a knife before the police arrived. 

He later claimed, in an interview with the Italian Antimafia Commission in 1971:

Drug trafficking 
He was a major drug trafficker with strong ties to the Detroit Partnership with Angelo Meli and the St. Louis crime family particularly Anthony "Tony" Giordano. He was also a close associate of Jimmy Hoffa. His activities soon led him to be on the FBI list of most wanted criminals.

Expelled to Italy 
In 1948 he was expelled from the United States and sent back to Italy. He settled in Ardea, near Rome, where he invested all the money accumulated, in real estate. In Italy, he allegedly dealt with clean business, however according to the judicial authorities, he was at the center of large drug trafficking operations. In the last period of life because of poor health, Coppola was hospitalized for over a year in an Aprilia clinic. He died on April 26, 1982.

Reference 

American gangsters of Sicilian descent
American drug traffickers
1899 births
1982 deaths
Italian emigrants to the United States